John Robert Tripson (September 17, 1919July 6, 1997) was a professional American football offensive tackle in the National Football League. He played one season for the Detroit Lions (1941).

He received the Navy Cross for gallantry in the invasion of North Africa in World War II, along with fellow former NFL player Robert Halperin.

References

1919 births
1997 deaths
People from Hidalgo County, Texas
Players of American football from Texas
American football offensive tackles
Mississippi State Bulldogs football players
Detroit Lions players
United States Navy personnel of World War II
United States Navy officers
Recipients of the Navy Cross (United States)
Military personnel from Texas